6-(2-Aminopropyl)-2,3-dihydrobenzofuran (6-APDB, 4-Desoxy-MDA, EMA-3) is a stimulant and entactogen drug of the phenethylamine and amphetamine classes. It is an analogue of MDA where the heterocyclic 4-position oxygen from the 3,4-methylenedioxy ring has been replaced with a methylene bridge. 5-APDB (3-Desoxy-MDA) is an analogue of 6-APDB where the 3-position oxygen has been replaced with a methylene instead. 6-APDB, along with 5-APDB, was first synthesized by David E. Nichols in the early 1990s while investigating non-neurotoxic MDMA analogues.

In animal studies, 6-APDB fully substitutes for MBDB and MMAI but not for amphetamine or LSD. In vitro, 6-APDB has been shown to inhibit the reuptake of serotonin, dopamine, and norepinephrine with IC50 values of 322 nM, 1,997 nM, and 980 nM, respectively. These values are very similar to those of MDA, but with those for the catecholamines slightly lower in comparison, perhaps more similarly to MDMA. In contrast, 5-APDB is highly selective for serotonin. Though 6-APDB does not substitute for amphetamine in rats at the doses used in referenced study, based on its in vitro profile it can be suggested that it may have amphetamine-like effects at higher doses.

The unsaturated benzofuran derivative 6-APB, or 6-(2-aminopropyl)benzofuran is also known, but the difference in pharmacological effects between 6-APB and 6-APDB is unclear.

6-APDB is a class B drug in the UK since June 10, 2013. It is banned by a blanket law on benzofurans and related compounds.

References 

6-Benzofuranethanamines
Designer drugs
Entactogens and empathogens
Serotonin-norepinephrine-dopamine releasing agents
Substituted amphetamines